Givaran may refer to:
 Givaran, Kerman
 Givaran, West Azerbaijan